Marek Tomica (born 1 January 1981) is a Czech professional ice hockey forward who currently plays for HC Slavia Praha of the Czech Extraliga.

Tomica played previously for HC Berounští Medvědi and BK Mladá Boleslav.

Career statistics

Regular season and playoffs

International

References

External links

1981 births
Living people
HC Slavia Praha players
Czech ice hockey forwards
Dallas Stars draft picks
Sportspeople from Třebíč
Piráti Chomutov players